Narcissistic leadership is a leadership style in which the leader is only interested in him/herself. Their priority is themselves – at the expense of their people/group members. This leader exhibits the characteristics of a narcissist: arrogance, dominance and hostility. It is a sufficiently common leadership style that it has acquired its own name. Narcissism is most often described as unhealthy and destructive. It has been described as "driven by unyielding arrogance, self-absorption, and a personal egotistic need for power and admiration".

Narcissism and groups
A study published in the journal Personality and Social Psychology Bulletin suggests that when a group is without a leader, a narcissist is likely to take charge. Researchers have found that people who score high in narcissism tend to take control of leaderless groups. Freud considered "the narcissistic type... especially suited to act as a support for others, to take on the role of leaders and to... impress others as being 'personalities'.": one reason may be that "another person's narcissism has a great attraction for those who have renounced part of their own... as if we envied them for maintaining a blissful state of mind—an unassailable libidinal position which we ourselves have since abandoned."

According to the book Narcissism: Behind the Mask, there are four basic types of leader with narcissists most commonly in type 3 although they may be in type 1:
 authoritarian with task oriented decision making
 democratic with task oriented decision making
 authoritarian with emotional decision making
 democratic with emotional decision making

Michael Maccoby stated that "psychoanalysts don't usually get close enough to [narcissistic leaders], especially in the workplace, to write about them."

Gender 
Women CEOs with narcissistic personalities are more likely than high-risk taking male narcissists to stabilize an organization, follow regulations, and implement them.

Corporate narcissism
According to Alan Downs, corporate narcissism occurs when a narcissist becomes the chief executive officer (CEO) or other leadership roles within the senior management team and gathers an adequate mix of codependents around him (or her) to support the narcissistic behavior. Narcissists profess company loyalty but are only really committed to their own agendas, thus organizational decisions are founded on the narcissist's own interests rather than the interests of the organization as a whole, the various stakeholders, or the society in which the organization operates. As a result, "a certain kind of charismatic leader can run a financially successful company on thoroughly unhealthy principles for a time. But ... the chickens always come home to roost".

Neville Symington has suggested that "one of the ways of differentiating a good-enough organisation from one that is pathological is through its ability to exclude narcissistic characters from key posts."

Impact of healthy v. destructive narcissistic managers
Lubit compared healthily narcissistic managers versus destructively narcissistic managers for their long-term impact on organizations.

See also

References

Further reading

Books
 Conrad E Petty tyranny, dogmatism, narcissistic leadership: what effects do authoritarian leadership styles have on employee morale and performance? (2004)
 Maccoby M Narcissistic leaders: who succeeds and who fails (2007)
 McFarlin DB & Sweeney PD House of mirrors: House of Mirrors: The Untold Truth About Narcissistic Leaders and How to Survive Them (2000)
 McFarlin DB & Sweeney PD Where Egos Dare: The Untold Truth about Narcissistic Leaders – And How to Survive Them (2002)
 Vaknin S Narcissistic and Psychopathic Leaders (2009)

Academic papers
 Brown B Narcissistic Leaders: Effectiveness and the Role of Followers – Otago Management Graduate Review Volume 3, 2005 pp. 69–87
 
 
 
 Kearney KS Grappling with the gods: Reflections for coaches of the narcissistic leader - International Journal of Evidence Based Coaching and Mentoring Vol 8 No 1 February 2010 pp. 1-13

External links
 Narcissism And Leadership: Does It Work To Be A Jerk?
 'Narcissistic' chief executives 'obsessed' with large pay packets Aol 21 Feb 2017
 Narcissistic CEOs at American banks took great risks, study shows Phys.org 03 May 2017

Narcissism
Strategic management
Leadership
Workplace bullying